The Norwegian Radio Orchestra (Norwegian, Kringkastingsorkestret, abbreviated as KORK) is a radio orchestra affiliated with the Norwegian Broadcasting Corporation (Norsk rikskringkasting AS, or NRK). Its principal base is the Store Studio at the NRK's headquarters in Oslo. The orchestra's current chief administrator is Rolf Lennart Stensø. As of 2018, KORK consists of fifty-nine musicians.

History
KORK was founded in 1946 with twenty-four musicians in the orchestra, from ensembles previously led by Øivind Bergh and Gunnar Knudsen. Øivind Bergh served as its first principal conductor from 1946 to 1976. The orchestra initially secured its reputation in performances of entertainment music and light classics. Sverre Bruland, KORK's second principal conductor from 1976 to 1988, established the orchestra's commitment to presenting contemporary Norwegian music.

Since the 2013–2014 season, the orchestra's current principal conductor is Miguel Harth-Bedoya. Harth-Bedoya is scheduled to stand down as principal conductor at the close of the 2019–2020 season. In the autumn of 2019, Petr Popelka first guest-conducted KORK. In November 2019, KORK announced the appointment of Popelka as its next principal conductor, effective with the 2020–2021 season.

KORK has recorded commercially for labels including Pro Musica, Bridge Records, and Finlandia. In addition to concerts and commercial recordings, the orchestra performs every year at the Nobel Peace Prize Concert. KORK has also worked in areas of popular music, such as providing backing to the Eurovision Song Contest in Norway in 1986 and 1996, as well as various activities in rock and jazz.

In 2011 KORK was awarded the Telenor Culture Prize Boundless Communication.

Principal conductors
 Øivind Bergh (1946–1976)
 Sverre Bruland (1976–1988)
 Avi Ostrowsky (1989–1992)
 Ari Rasilainen (1994–2002)
 Rolf Gupta (2003–2006)
 Thomas Søndergård (2009–2012)
 Miguel Harth-Bedoya (2013–2020)
 Petr Popelka (2020–present)

References

External links

 Official Norwegian KORK homepage
 Classics Today review of Johann Svendsen symphonies (Warner Apex - 0927 40621 2)

Norwegian orchestras
Radio and television orchestras
Symphony orchestras
NRK
Musical groups established in 1946
1946 establishments in Norway
Musical groups from Oslo
Household Records artists